The 2021–22 Ottawa Senators season was the 30th season of the Ottawa Senators of the National Hockey League (NHL). The Senators attempted to return to the Stanley Cup playoffs after failing to qualify for the past four seasons. The Senators returned to the Atlantic Division after playing in the North Division in 2020–21.

On April 6, 2022, the Senators were eliminated from playoff contention when the Washington Capitals defeated the Tampa Bay Lightning.

Team business
In July 2021, the team hired Pierre McGuire as senior vice president of player development. McGuire, who had most recently been a broadcaster with the NHL on NBC, had previously been an assistant coach with the Senators. In August 2021, the Senators announced their new East Coast Hockey League affiliation with the Atlanta Gladiators.

Owner Eugene Melnyk passed away on March 28, 2022, due to an unspecified illness. In statements in recent years, Melnyk had said that he planned to leave the team to his two daughters Olivia and Anna, when he had been asked if he intended to sell the team, although there has been speculation about ownership changes. The team added an 'EM' patch on the jersey for the rest of the season.

In April 2022, the club announced a joint proposal with the Ottawa Sports and Entertainment Group to host the 2023 IIHF World Junior Hockey Championships in Ottawa. 

The National Capital Commission (NCC) resumed the process to redevelop the LeBreton Flats overall site, reserving the site of an arena and asking for preliminary bids on the arena site separately. After a February 2022 deadline to submit bids, the NCC announced that it had received several bids for the site. Local media speculated that the Senators were actively pursuing a bid, authorized by Melnyk shortly before his death. In June 2022, the NCC accepted the Senators' proposal for a new downtown arena and mixed-use development as part of the Lebreton Flats redevelopment. The team will lease the land for their development. Construction is not expected before 2024 after a leasing agreement is finalized and municipal review of the project is completed. The lease agreement is expected to be put in place by autumn of 2023.

Standings

Divisional standings

Conference standings

Schedule and results

Preseason
The pre-season schedule was published on July 21, 2021.

Regular season
The regular season schedule was published on July 22, 2021. On November 15, the NHL announced the postponement of three Senators games due to there being ten Senators players in the League's COVID-19 protocol with "evidence of continued spread in recent days", rendering the team inactive until they were cleared to return to practice on November 20, in time to play their November 22 game hosted by the Colorado Avalanche. In the meantime, three games were postponed: at the New Jersey Devils on the 16th, against the Nashville Predators on the 18th, and against the New York Rangers on the 20th.

Player statistics

Skaters

Goaltenders

†Denotes player spent time with another team before joining the Senators. Stats reflect time with the Senators only.
‡No longer with the Senators.

Awards and honours

Milestones

Transactions
The Senators have been involved in the following transactions during the 2021–22 season.

Trades

Notes:
 St. Louis will receive a 4th-round pick in 2022 if Brown plays fewer than 30 games for St. Louis in 2021–22; otherwise no pick will be exchanged.
 Ottawa will receive a 7th-round pick in 2022 if Senyshyn plays at least 5 games with Ottawa during the 2021-22 season; otherwise Ottawa will receive a 6th-round pick in 2022.

Players acquired

Players lost

Signings

Draft picks

The Senators' top pick was the tenth-overall draft pick in the 2021 NHL Entry Draft, Tyler Boucher. The Senators made two trades on day two of the draft, moving up in the selections and ending up with six selections overall. The draft was held July 23–24, 2024 virtually via video conference call from the NHL Network studio in Secaucus, New Jersey.

References

Ottawa Senators seasons
2021–22 NHL season by team
Senators
2021 in Ontario
2022 in Ontario